St. Joseph's Church, Juhu is a Roman Catholic church located in Juhu, Mumbai.

History
In the years prior to the creation of the parish of St. Joseph's, Juhu was a long, narrow island off the west coast of Salsette, just north of the city.

References

Roman Catholic churches in Mumbai
Roman Catholic churches in Maharashtra
Roman Catholic churches completed in 1853
19th-century Roman Catholic church buildings in India